Charles Roy Henderson ( – ) was an American statistician and a pioneer in animal breeding — the application of quantitative methods for the genetic evaluation of domestic livestock. This is critically important because it allows farmers and geneticists to predict whether a crop or animal will have a desired trait, and to what extent the trait will be expressed. He developed mixed model equations to obtain best linear unbiased predictions of breeding values and, in general, any random effect. He invented three methods for the estimation of variance components in unbalanced settings of mixed models, and invented a method for constructing the inverse of Wright's numerator relationship matrix based on a simple list of pedigree information. He, with his Ph.D. student Shayle R. Searle, greatly extended the use of matrix notation in statistics. His methods are widely used by the domestic livestock industry throughout the world and are a cornerstone of linear model theory.

Henderson obtained his B.Sc., M.Sc.(nutrition) and Ph.D.(breeding) degrees at Iowa State University, where he was a student of Professor L. N. Hazel. Henderson joined the faculty of the Department of Animal Science at Cornell University in 1948, and headed the Animal Breeding division for nearly 30 years until he retired in 1976. After retiring from Cornell, he was a visiting professor at the University of Guelph and University of Illinois until his death. He completed his book in 1984 at the University of Guelph.

Honors and awards
 1955, Senior Fulbright Research Scholar (New Zealand)
 1964, Borden Award, American Dairy Science Association
 1964, Animal Breeding and Genetics Award, American Society of Animal Science
 1969, Fellow, American Statistical Association
 1971, Morrison Award, American Society of Animal Science
 1977, National Association of Animal Breeders Award, American Dairy Science Association
 1980, Member of the Massey University Wellington
 1981, Visiting professor at the University of California, Davis
 1981, Hermann-von-Nathusius-Medaille in Gold of the German Society for Animal Production (DGfZ) 
 1981, Fellow, American Society of Animal Science
 1982, Jay L. Lush Animal Breeding and Genetics Award, American Dairy Science Association
 1984, Henry A. Wallace Award for Service to Agriculture, Iowa State University
 1985, Elected to the United States National Academy of Sciences

Selected bibliography

1990s
 
 
1980s
 
 
 
 
 
 
 
 
 
 
 
 
 
 
 
 
 
 
1970s
 
 
 
 
 
 
 
 
 
 
 
 
 
 
 
 
 
 
 
 
1960s
 
 
 
 
 
 
 
 
 
 
 
 
1950s

References

Footnotes

External links
 
 

1911 births
1989 deaths
Biostatisticians
American geneticists
Iowa State University alumni
Cornell University faculty
Fellows of the American Statistical Association
Members of the United States National Academy of Sciences
Deaths from pulmonary embolism
20th-century American mathematicians
Fulbright alumni
Academic staff of the University of Guelph